Karigasniemi is a village in the municipality of Utsjoki in Finland. It lies at the foot of Mount Ailigás.

It lies on the banks of the river Inarijoki (Anarjohka), which, downstream of Karigasniemi, joins the river Karasjohka to form the famous salmon fishing river Tana.

Karigasniemi lies on the road between the Finnish town of Ivalo and Lakselv in Norway.

Karigasniemi is home to about 300 people, of which more than half are Sámi. There are one grocery store, two petrol stations and three bars and restaurants, mostly because of a lot of border traffic from the Norwegian side. There is also, a school and a small health care center in the village.

Karigasniemi is also a junction point where travellers can choose the road to Nordkapp or other places at the Arctic Ocean.

External links 

Finland–Norway border crossings
Utsjoki
Villages in Finland